Kung Fu Cult Master (Chinese: 倚天屠龍記之魔教教主) is a 1993 Hong Kong wuxia film adapted from Louis Cha's novel The Heaven Sword and Dragon Saber. Directed by Wong Jing, it featured fight choreography by Sammo Hung, and starred Jet Li, Sharla Cheung, Chingmy Yau and Gigi Lai in the lead roles.

The controversy of the film was changing the protagonist's character from a righteous hero to a power-hungry and vengeful hypocrite, and thus not faithful to the novel. As the film performed poorly at the box office, plans for its sequels were cancelled and hence its cliffhanger ending was left unresolved.

Plot
Zhang Wuji and his parents return from an isolated island and travel to Mount Wudang to celebrate his grandteacher Zhang Sanfeng's 100th birthday. Several martial artists attempt to force Zhang Wuji's parents to reveal the whereabouts of his godfather, Xie Xun, but they refuse and commit suicide in defiance. Zhang Wuji has been seriously injured by the Xuanming Elders and almost dies, but Zhang Sanfeng shows special care towards him and attempts to preserve his life. However, that incurs the jealousy of his senior Song Qingshu, who collaborates with Zhou Zhiruo of the Emei School to harm him.

One day, Zhang Wuji is bullied by Song Qingshu and falls off a cliff together with Xiaozhao, a girl who helped him. They meet Huogong Toutuo by coincidence and Zhang recovers from his wounds completely and learns the powerful "Nine Yang Skill" in the process. Zhang discovers later that the Shaolin School is plotting with five other martial arts schools to attack Bright Peak, the headquarters of the Ming Cult, where Zhang's maternal grandfather, Yin Tianzheng, is. Zhang ventures into a forbidden place on the peak and finds the "Heaven and Earth Great Shift" manual, mastering another powerful skill, and he helps the Ming Cult defeat the six schools. The cult members are grateful to Zhang and choose him to be their leader.

Zhang Wuji discovers that the conflict between the Ming Cult and the six schools was instigated by his godfather's sworn enemy, Cheng Kun, who has been in disguise as a Shaolin monk all this while. At the same time, he encounters Zhao Min, a Mongol princess who is also an enemy of his cult. She uses a special drug to poison the cult's members. When Zhang demands that she gives him the antidote, she makes him promise to help her do three things in exchange for the antidote. At the same time, Yin Tianzheng and the cult's members, who mistakenly think that the Shaolin School was behind the poisoning, go to Shaolin Monastery to take revenge but, to their surprise, they see corpses everywhere.

In fact, Song Qingshu had betrayed the Wudang School and defected to the Mongol-led Yuan government. He is plotting with Zhao Min and her men to kill Zhang Sanfeng, but Zhang Wuji returns in time and saves his grandteacher. Zhang promises to not use his newly mastered skills and manages to defeat the Xuanming Elders using taijiquan. The film ends on a cliffhanger as Zhao Min leaves after telling Zhang Wuji to go to Dadu to find her if he wants to rescue the missing members of the six schools.

Cast
 Jet Li as Chang Mo-Gei (Zhang Wuji)
 Sharla Cheung as Chao Min / Yan So-so (Zhao Min / Yin Susu)
 Gigi Lai as Chow Chi-yu (Zhou Zhiruo)
 Chingmy Yau as Tsu Chu (Xiaozhao)
 Sammo Hung as Chang San-fung (Zhang Sanfeng)
 Francis Ng as Chang Tsui San (Zhang Cuishan)
 Sun Mengquan as No-mercy (Miejue)
 Bryan Leung as Jinx / Luk Sin-sang / Sung Yuen Kin (Lu Zhangke)
 Collin Chou as Sung Ching Su (Song Qingshu)
 Richard Ng as Wai Yat-siu (Wei Yixiao)
 Yan Huaili as Xie Xun
 Cho Wing as Shaolin monk fighter
 Tenky Tin as Mount Hua priest
 Ekin Cheng
 Lam Ching-ying
 John Ching 
 Chow Yee-fan

Alternative titles
Alternative titles for the film include:
 Kung Fu Master (DVD release Oct 9, 1999)
 Evil Cult USA (DVD release Dec 10, 2000)
 Lord of the Wu Tang (DVD release Feb 6, 1996)

External links
 
 
 

1993 films
1993 action films
1990s Cantonese-language films
Films based on works by Jin Yong
Hong Kong martial arts films
Works based on The Heaven Sword and Dragon Saber
Wuxia films
Films set in the 14th century
Films set in the Yuan dynasty
Kung fu films
Films about rebels
Films set on islands
Films directed by Wong Jing
1990s Hong Kong films